DiFronzo or DeFronzo may refer to:

DiFronzo
John DiFronzo (1928–2018), nicknamed "No Nose", American mobster and the reputed former boss of the Chicago Outfit
Peter DiFronzo (1933-2020), brother of John DiFronzo (reputed to be the leader of the Chicago Outfit) and Joseph DiFronzo

DeFronzo
Donald DeFronzo, American politician